Varadaiahpalem  mandal is one of the 34 mandals in Tirupati district in the Indian state of Andhra Pradesh. It is a part of Sullurupeta revenue division. The mandal used to be a part of Chittoor district and was made part of the newly formed Tirupati district on 4 April 2022.

References 

Mandals in Tirupati district